No. 16 Squadron Indian Air Force (Black Cobras), is a counter-air and interdiction unit, operating out of the Indian Air Force station in Gorakhpur.

In 2001, the squadron was operating SEPECAT Jaguar IS and IB fighter jets. The squadron started using them in October 1986, and was still using them as of 2001.

History

16 Squadron of the Indian Air Force was formed at Pune in 1950, with six Supermarine Spitfires, and one Hawker Tempest. They served as a bomber squadron of the Western Air Command.

The squadron was re-equipped in 1954, with B-24 Liberators. Its role was also changed to heavy bombing. In 1957, the squadron received English Electric Canberras, and was moved to Kalaikunda. In October–December 1986, the squadron was re-equipped with SEPECAT Jaguars, which are deep penetration strike aircraft. The squadron’s current roles are identified as counter-air and interdiction.

Use in combat 

The squadron entered battle for the first time during the annexation of Goa, where it flew bombing raids against Dabolim Airfield. The squadron also flew a few raids in Diu.

During the Indo-Pakistani War of 1965, the squadron flew several sorties and strike missions.

During the War of 1971, the squadron was involved in many missions under the command of Commander P. Gautam (MVC, Bar to VM).

Aircraft

Aircraft types operated by the squadron

Awards
 Wg Cdr Padmanabha Gautam GDP, MVC
 JWO Kuthukallunkal Krishnan Raju Eng/Fit, CAS Commendation
 Air Cmde William George Beddoe GDP, Vayu Sena Medal, CAS Commendation

References

016
Military units and formations established in 1950